A United Nations Security Council resolution (UNSCR) is a United Nations resolution adopted by the fifteen members of the Security Council (UNSC); the United Nations (UN) body charged with "primary responsibility for the maintenance of international peace and security".

The UN Charter specifies (in Article 27) that a draft resolution on non-procedural matters is adopted if nine or more of the fifteen Council members vote for the resolution, and if it is not vetoed by any of the five permanent members. Draft resolutions on "procedural matters" can be adopted on the basis of an affirmative vote by any nine Council members. The five permanent members are the People's Republic of China (which replaced the Republic of China in 1971), France, Russia (which replaced the defunct Soviet Union in 1991), the United Kingdom, and the United States.

, the Security Council has passed 2672 resolutions.

Terms and functions mentioned in the UN Charter
The term "resolution" does not appear in the text of the United Nations Charter. It contains numerous formulations, such as "decision" or "recommendation", which imply the adoption of resolutions which do not specify the method to be used.

The UN Charter is a multilateral treaty. It is the constitutional document that distributes powers and functions among the various UN organs. It authorizes the Security Council to take action on behalf of the members, and to make decisions and recommendations. The Charter mentions neither binding nor non-binding resolutions. The International Court of Justice (ICJ) advisory opinion in the 1949 "Reparations" case indicated that the United Nations Organization had both explicit and implied powers. The Court cited Articles 104 and 2(5) of the Charter, and noted that the members had granted the Organization the necessary legal authority to exercise its functions and fulfill its purposes as specified or implied in the Charter, and that they had agreed to give the United Nations every assistance in any action taken in accordance with the Charter.

Article 25 of the Charter says that "The Members of the United Nations agree to accept and carry out the decisions of the Security Council in accordance with the present Charter". The Repertory of Practice of United Nations Organs, a UN legal publication, says that during the United Nations Conference on International Organization which met in San Francisco in 1945, attempts to limit obligations of Members under Article 25 of the Charter to those decisions taken by the Council in the exercise of its specific powers under Chapters VI, VII and VIII of the Charter failed. It was stated at the time that those obligations also flowed from the authority conferred on the Council under Article 24(1) to act on the behalf of the members while exercising its responsibility for the maintenance of international peace and security. Article 24, interpreted in this sense, becomes a source of authority which can be drawn upon to meet situations which are not covered by the more detailed provisions in the succeeding articles. The Repertory on Article 24 says: "The question whether Article 24 confers general powers on the Security Council ceased to be a subject of discussion following the advisory opinion of the International Court of Justice rendered on 21 June 1971 in connection with the question of Namibia (ICJ Reports, 1971, page 16)".

In exercising its powers the Security Council seldom bothers to cite the particular article or articles of the UN Charter that its decisions are based upon. In cases where none are mentioned, a constitutional interpretation is required. This sometimes presents ambiguities as to what amounts to a decision as opposed to a recommendation, and also the relevance and interpretation of the phrase "in accordance with the present Charter".

If the Security Council cannot reach consensus or a passing vote on a resolution, they may choose to produce a non-binding presidential statement instead of a Resolution. These are adopted by consensus. They are meant to apply political pressure—a warning that the Council is paying attention and further action may follow.

Press statements typically accompany both resolutions and presidential statements, carrying the text of the document adopted by the body and also some explanatory text.  They may also be released independently, after a significant meeting.

See also

 United Nations Security Council resolutions by topic
 United Nations General Assembly resolution
 List of vetoed United Nations Security Council resolutions

Notes

External links

 UN Security Council Official Website including full text of all resolutions
 How to Find General Assembly and Security Council Resolutions and Voting Records

 

de:UN-Resolution#Resolutionen des UN-Sicherheitsrats